Murder in New Hampshire constitutes the intentional killing, under circumstances defined by law, of people within or under the jurisdiction of the U.S. state of New Hampshire.

The United States Centers for Disease Control and Prevention reported that in the year 2020, the state had the lowest murder rate in the country, in a near tie with Vermont.

Felony murder rule
In the state of New Hampshire, the common law formulation of the felony murder rule has been replaced by the Model Penal Code's formulation of the rule.

The felony murder rule is codified as a form of second-degree murder, at RSA 630:1-b, I(b).

Penalties
Source:

References

Murder in New Hampshire
U.S. state criminal law
New Hampshire law